Earl of Tankerville is a noble title drawn from Tancarville in Normandy. The title has been created three times: twice in the Peerage of England, and once (in 1714) in the Peerage of Great Britain for Charles Bennet, 2nd Baron Ossulston. His father, John Bennett, 1st Baron Ossulston, was the elder brother of Henry Bennett, 1st Earl of Arlington. The family seat was Chillingham Castle in Northumberland.

The Earl of Tankerville holds the subsidiary title of Baron Ossulston, of Ossulston in the County of Middlesex (1682), in the Peerage of England.

Earls of Tankerville, First Creation (1418)
John Grey, 1st Earl of Tankerville (1384–1421)
Henry Grey, 2nd Earl of Tankerville (1419–1450)
Richard Grey, 3rd Earl of Tankerville (1436–1466) (lands lost 1453, forfeit 1459)

Earls of Tankerville, Second Creation (1695)
see Baron Grey of Werke

Barons Ossulston (1682)
John Bennet, 1st Baron Ossulston (1616–1695)
Charles Bennet, 2nd Baron Ossulston (1674–1722) (created Earl of Tankerville in 1714)

Earls of Tankerville, Third Creation (1714)
Charles Bennet, 1st Earl of Tankerville (1674–1722)
Charles Bennet, 2nd Earl of Tankerville (1697-1753)
Charles Bennet, 3rd Earl of Tankerville (1716–1767)
Charles Bennet, 4th Earl of Tankerville (1743–1822)
 Charles Bennet, 5th Earl of Tankerville  (1776–1859)
Charles Bennet, 6th Earl of Tankerville (1810–1899)
Charles Bennett, Lord Ossulston (1850–1879)
George Montagu Bennet, 7th Earl of Tankerville (1852–1931)
Charles Augustus Ker Bennett, 8th Earl of Tankerville (1897–1971)
Charles Augustus Grey Bennett, 9th Earl of Tankerville (1921–1980)
Peter Grey Bennett, 10th Earl of Tankerville (born 1956)

The present earl lives in West London. His cousin Adrian George Bennett (b. 1958) is heir presumptive.

See also
Earl of Arlington
Tancarville castle
House of Harcourt

References

External links

Earldoms in the Peerage of Great Britain
1418 establishments in England
Noble titles created in 1418
Noble titles created in 1695
Noble titles created in 1714